King Center may refer to:

Martin Luther King Jr. National Historical Park, Atlanta, Georgia
King Center for Nonviolent Social Change
King Center for the Performing Arts, Melbourne, Florida